Dyott is a surname. Notable people with the surname include:

Anthony Dyott, English lawyer and politician who sat in the House of Commons between 1601 and 1614
George Dyott, British pioneer aviator and explorer of the Amazon
Richard Dyott (disambiguation), any of four different British politicians